Ceramium strictum is a small marine red alga.

Description
This alga grows in tufts to a length of no more than 12 cm long. It is densely branched but not completely corticate appearing to have a banded or collar-like appearance. The apices of the axes are strongly inrolled. The branches do not have spines. Rhizoids are numerous.

Reproduction
Cystocarps containing carposporangia and tetrasporangia are borne on the erect thalli.

Habitat
Epiphytic on other algae and mussels in the littoral.

Distribution
Southern and western coasts of England and Ireland. In Europe from Norway to France and the Azores.

Nomenclature
The validity of the name Ceramium strictum is as yet unsure.

References

strictum